Khellven Douglas Silva Oliveira (born 25 February 2001), simply known as Khellven, is a Brazilian footballer who plays as a right back for Athletico Paranaense.

Career statistics

Club

Honours
Athletico Paranaense
Campeonato Paranaense: 2019, 2020
J.League Cup / Copa Sudamericana Championship: 2019
Copa do Brasil: 2019
Copa Sudamericana: 2021

References

External links

2001 births
Living people
Sportspeople from Rio Grande do Norte
Brazilian footballers
Association football defenders
Campeonato Brasileiro Série A players
Guarani de Palhoça players
Club Athletico Paranaense players